Paramanteriella is a genus of trematodes in the family Opecoelidae.

Species
Paramanteriella cantherini Li, Qiu & Zhang, 1988
Paramanteriella capoori (Jaiswal, Upadhyay, Malhotra, Blend, Dronen & Malhotra, 2014) Martin, Cutmore & Cribb, 2017
Paramanteriella confusa (Overstreet, 1969) Martin, Cutmore & Cribb, 2017
Paramanteriella leiperi (Gupta, 1956) Martin, Cutmore & Cribb, 2017
Paramanteriella pallenisca (Shipley & Hornell, 1905) Martin, Cutmore & Cribb, 2017

References

Opecoelidae
Plagiorchiida genera